Alyona Kolesnik (born 29 January 1995) is a Ukrainian-Azerbaijani freestyle wrestler. She is a three-time bronze medalist at the European Wrestling Championships. She is also a two-time silver medalist at the Islamic Solidarity Games. She won bronze in her event at the 2019 European Games.

Career 

At the 2017 European Wrestling Championships held in Novi Sad, Serbia, she won one of the bronze medals in the women's 55 kg event. In 2018, she also won one of the bronze medals in the women's 57 kg and she repeated this in 2019 with another bronze medal in the same event.

At the 2017 Islamic Solidarity Games held in Baku, Azerbaijan, she won the silver medal in the women's 58 kg event. In the final, she lost against Aisuluu Tynybekova of Kyrgyzstan.

She won one of the bronze medals in the women's 57 kg event at the 2019 European Games held in Minsk, Belarus. In her bronze medal match she defeated Bediha Gün of Turkey. In 2020, at the European Wrestling Championships held in Rome, Italy, she competed in the women's 57 kg event. She lost her bronze medal match against Iryna Kurachkina of Belarus. In 2020, she competed in the women's 57 kg event at the Individual Wrestling World Cup held in Belgrade, Serbia where she lost her bronze medal match against Veronika Chumikova of Russia.

In March 2021, she competed at the European Qualification Tournament in Budapest, Hungary hoping to qualify for the 2020 Summer Olympics in Tokyo, Japan. She lost her first match against Evelina Nikolova of Bulgaria and she was then eliminated in her next match in the repechage. She also failed to qualify for the Olympics at the World Olympic Qualification Tournament held in Sofia, Bulgaria.

In October 2021, she was eliminated in her first match in the women's 59 kg event at the World Wrestling Championships held in Oslo, Norway. In January 2022, she won the gold medal in the women's 59 kg event at the Golden Grand Prix Ivan Yarygin held in Krasnoyarsk, Russia. In February 2022, she won one of the bronze medals in the women's 59 kg event at the Yasar Dogu Tournament held in Istanbul, Turkey. She lost her bronze medal match in the 59 kg event at the 2022 European Wrestling Championships held in Budapest, Hungary.

She won the silver medal in the 59 kg event at the 2021 Islamic Solidarity Games held in Konya, Turkey. She competed in the 59 kg event at the 2022 World Wrestling Championships held in Belgrade, Serbia.

She won the bronze medal in the women's 59kg event at the 2023 Grand Prix Zagreb Open held in Zagreb, Croatia.

Achievements

References

External links 

 

Living people
1995 births
Place of birth missing (living people)
Azerbaijani female sport wrestlers
Wrestlers at the 2019 European Games
European Games bronze medalists for Azerbaijan
European Games medalists in wrestling
European Wrestling Championships medalists
Islamic Solidarity Games medalists in wrestling
Islamic Solidarity Games competitors for Azerbaijan
20th-century Ukrainian women
21st-century Azerbaijani women